Bakhshi (adjective form of Bakhsh – a type of administrative division of Iran – which in itself is a hyponym of the Persian noun بخش (baxš), meaning part, portion; section; district; fortune) is a Dari, Persian, Pakistani and Indian surname. Notable people with the surname include:

 Esmail Bakhshi (born 1983), Iranian political prisoner
 Enayatollah Bakhshi (born 1945), Iranian veteran actor
 Jon Bakhshi (born 19??), American restaurateur of Iranian Jewish descent
 Mohammad Tawfiq Bakhshi (born 1986), Afghan judoka
 Rajan Bakhshi (born 19??), Indian Army General officer
 Sandeep Bakhshi (born 1960/61), Indian banker

bakhshi was the title given to Military paymaster during Akbar regime in India.

See also 
 Bakshi

References 

Persian-language surnames
Dari-language surnames